Kego Township is a township in Cass County, Minnesota, United States. The population was 465 as of the 2000 census. Kego is a name derived from the Ojibwe language, meaning "fish".

Geography

The city of Longville is located entirely within Kego Township geographically but is a separate entity.

Major highways
  Minnesota State Highway 84
  Minnesota State Highway 200

Lakes
 Blot Lake
 Boxell Lake
 Boxnell Lake
 Bullhead Lake
 Carnahan Lake
 County Lake
 Craig Lake (north three-quarters)
 Crown Lake
 Football Lake
 Ford Lake (west edge)
 Gijik Lake
 Girl Lake (vast majority)
 Gooseberry Lake
 Kego Lake
 Little Silver Lake (vast majority)
 Long Lake
 Long Lake (west three-quarters)
 Lundeen Lake
 Maple Lake
 Marshall Lake
 Nellie Lake (north three-quarters)
 Silver Lake (east edge)
 Tadpole Lake
 Tamarack Lake
 Three Island Lake
 Town Line Lake (south half)
 Woman Lake (north edge)

Adjacent townships
 Boy Lake Township (north)
 Rogers Township (northeast)
 Inguadona Township (east)
 Wabedo Township (south)
 Woodrow Township (southwest)
 Pine Lake Township (west)

Cemeteries
The township contains the following cemeteries: Riverside and Saint Edwards.

Demographics
As of the census of 2000, there were 465 people, 200 households, and 138 families residing in the township.  The population density was 14.7 people per square mile (5.7/km2).  There were 628 housing units at an average density of 19.9/sq mi (7.7/km2).  The racial makeup of the township was 85.38% White, 13.12% Native American, 0.22% Asian, and 1.29% from two or more races.

There were 200 households, out of which 26.0% had children under the age of 18 living with them, 58.5% were married couples living together, 6.0% had a female householder with no husband present, and 31.0% were non-families. 25.5% of all households were made up of individuals, and 15.0% had someone living alone who was 65 years of age or older.  The average household size was 2.33 and the average family size was 2.78.

In the township the population was spread out, with 23.7% under the age of 18, 4.3% from 18 to 24, 21.9% from 25 to 44, 28.6% from 45 to 64, and 21.5% who were 65 years of age or older.  The median age was 45 years. For every 100 females, there were 97.0 males.  For every 100 females age 18 and over, there were 97.2 males.

The median income for a household in the township was $30,750, and the median income for a family was $35,481. Males had a median income of $25,972 versus $20,417 for females. The per capita income for the township was $15,598.  About 11.7% of families and 16.2% of the population were below the poverty line, including 26.0% of those under age 18 and 11.3% of those age 65 or over.

References
 United States National Atlas
 United States Census Bureau 2007 TIGER/Line Shapefiles
 United States Board on Geographic Names (GNIS)

Townships in Cass County, Minnesota
Brainerd, Minnesota micropolitan area
Townships in Minnesota